is a Japanese football player. He plays for FC Kariya.

Playing career
Shunya Kamiya played for J3 League club; Fujieda MYFC from 2014 to 2015. In 2016, he moved to FC Kariya.

References

External links

1991 births
Living people
Tokai Gakuen University alumni
Association football people from Aichi Prefecture
Japanese footballers
J3 League players
Japan Football League players
Fujieda MYFC players
FC Kariya players
Association football midfielders